Thom Panunzio is a music producer and engineer.

His career began in 1974 at the Record Plant Studios NYC, working with John Lennon. Later, he became a staff engineer at the Record Plant, and later at The Hit Factory.

Panunzio worked often with Jimmy Iovine, making several records together. Panunzio also worked with Andrew Loog Oldham on The Rolling Stones' Metamorphosis in 1975, and later that year worked with Bruce Springsteen on Born to Run. In 1978, he worked with Patti Smith on Easter, while simultaneously working again with Springsteen on Darkness on the Edge of Town. Panunzio has also produced, engineered and mixed artists including Bob Dylan, U2, Stevie Nicks, Black Sabbath, Ozzy Osbourne, Motörhead, Deep Purple, Aerosmith, The Who, Iggy Pop, Joan Jett, David Bowie, Tom Petty, and Paul Butterfield, among others. Panunzio's experience also includes the making of motion picture soundtracks, such as Road House and Rattle & Hum. Panunzio also worked as the live musical producer for the Farmclub.com series.

Panunzio helped design The Hit Factory studios for the Germano family in New York, as well as A&M Studios (now Henson Recording Studios) in Los Angeles. Later, he helped design the Interscope/ Geffen/ A&M studios where he also created The Thom Thom Club.

In 2003, Panunzio joined Universal Music Group as Executive Senior VP, and Head of A&R for Geffen Records, where he oversaw the careers of Nelly Furtado, Weezer, The Pussycat Dolls, Rise Against and others on the Interscope/Geffen/A&M roster. He also served as the musical producer for all the live music on season 10 of American Idol.

Selected discography 
(P) Produced (CP) Co-Produced (EP) Executive Produced (E) Engineered (AE) Assistant Engineered (M) Mixed

References

External links 
 
 
 

American record producers
Living people
American audio engineers
1951 births